Pura Vida , sometimes known as ¡Pura vida!, is a Mexican film released in 1956. The film is notable for popularizing the phrase pura vida, particularly in Costa Rica.

Plot
The film follows the story of Melquiades Ledezma, who is expelled from his home town after being labeled a source of bad luck. Misfortune finds him in his new home when he is accused of robbery and intentionally starting fires. His unlucky streak ends when he finds a winning lottery ticket of a million pesos.

Production
The film was directed by Gilberto Martínez Solares and filmed in 1955. The film runs for 90 minutes.

Partial cast
 Antonio Espino as Melquiades Ledezma
 Carmelita González as Lucía
 Maricruz Olivier as Esperanza
 Ramón Valdés as Caimán

Legacy
Despite his constant blunders, Melquiades Ledezma keeps a positive attitude. As an adjective synonymous with "good" or "nice", he uses pura vida (lit. pure life) a total of thirteen times to describe people (such as the town mayor), objects (food and earrings) and an action (being invited for a meal). This optimistic response began to be emulated by some Costa Ricans after the film's release in that country.

Although used since the late 1950s in Costa Rica, wide adoption of the phrase seems to have been spurred by the comparison of quality of life in Costa Rica with the rest of Central America in the 1980s. In modern Costa Rica, the phrase has many meanings and can be used as a greeting, farewell, thank you, and to show admiration for an object, situation or person. The phrase has come to embody the character of Costa Rica.

See also
Costa Rica–Mexico relations

References

External links 
 

1956 films
1956 comedy films
Mexican comedy films
1950s Spanish-language films
Films directed by Gilberto Martínez Solares
1950s Mexican films
Mexican black-and-white films